(The Best Pastry Chef) is a French culinary reality show broadcast on M6 since 2012 and in Belgium on RTL-TVI1.

Adapted from the British show The Great British Bake Off, it is hosted by Marie Portolano. The jury consists of chef Cyril Lignac and culinary blogger Jacqueline Mercorelli, better known by her stage name "". They are frequently joined by guest judges.

There have been eleven seasons of the main show, in which amateur bakers compete to be crowned The Best Pastry Chef.

The broadcast is followed by an aftershow entitled  (The Best Pastry Chef: To your ovens).

Production and organisation

Filming 

The main series is shot in the grounds of various French castles: the first and eleventh series at the Château de Neuville in Gambais, the fifth at the Château de Maillebois near Chartres and the rest at the Château de Groussay in Montfort-l'Amaury.

Since one episode takes two days to film, it takes six weeks in total to shoot each series.

Hosting and voice-over 

Faustine Bollaert hosted the programme from the launch episode until the second celebrity special series in 2017 (Meilleur Pâtissier, spécial célébrités), just before her departure for France 2. Seasons 6 to 9 were hosted by Julia Vignali.<ref>Author=Charlotte Moreau M6 : Julia Vignali remplace Faustine Bollaert au «Meilleur Pâtissier» |https://www.leparisien.fr/culture-loisirs/tv/m6-julia-vignali-remplace-faustine-bollaert-25-04-2017-6889374.php |site=leparisien.fr |date=2017-04-25 |consulted on=2020-09-13</ref> Seasons 10 and 11 have been hosted by Marie Portolano.

Meanwhile, Nathalie Homs has consistently performed the voice-over.

 Casting and selection of contestants 

There are several phases involved in the programme's casting process. For each series, the production team receives between 4,000 and 5,000 applications along with candidates’ photos. After reviewing these, only 400 to 600 amateur bakers are selected to visit the production offices where on-camera casting is carried out. Would-be contestants arrive with two cakes. The first is a specific example of traditional French patisserie. The second is a personal creation. A shortlist of forty is selected and a "life-size" test then carried out in a professional kitchen in the presence of Mercotte and the host among others. Here, fourteen candidates emerge who will go on to participate in the programme.

Since season 9, one of the spots is reserved for the winner of En Route pour le Meilleur Pâtissier!  (En route for The Best Pastry Chef!), which is a short competition featuring teenage bakers that takes place earlier in the summer.

 Judges 

Cyril Lignac (from series 1)

Jacqueline Mercorelli, stage name "" (from series 1, except for Les Professionnels)

 (only in series 1 and 2 of Les Professionnels)

 (only in Les Professionnels)

Frédéric Bau (only in series 1 of Les Professionnels)

Audrey Gellet (only in series 2 of Les Professionnels)

Benoît Blin (only in series 3 of Les Professionnels)

 Format 

In each episode, amateur bakers compete in a series of timed individual challenges: Cyril's Challenge (le défi de Cyril), Mercotte's Technical Test (l'épreuve technique de Mercotte), and the Creative Test (l'épreuve créative).  The best among them across all the challenges is named Pastry Chef of the Week (pâtissier/ère de la semaine). They are awarded the Blue Apron (le tablier bleu), which they get to wear during the next episode.  The worst among them is eliminated from the competition.  In the final episode, the winner is crowned Best Pastry Chef (le meilleur pâtissier), where they are awarded a trophy and the publication of their own recipe book.

Each episode's challenges are organized more or less along a broad theme, for instance a particular country or French region (e.g. India, the United States, Alsace, Bretagne), a cultural concept (school, rock and roll, vacation, cinema), or a particular story (Snow White, 1001 Nights, or French Fried Vacation 2 [Les Bronzés Font du Ski].) Perennial themes have become show traditions, like the sexy theme "50 shades of cream" (50 nuances de crème), or the regional rivalry pitting North vs South (Nord contre Sud).There are no themes organized around types of baking.  French language and culture distinguish pastry baking (pâtisserie) from bread baking (boulangerie), and this show only features the former.  So for each challenge, the bakers must show mastery of different styles of pâtisserie--- cakes, gateaux, desserts, entremets, pies, tortes, etc., to make something fitting the theme and the limits of the challenge.

 The challenges 
Each episode has three rounds, each testing distinct aspects of patisserie.

 Cyril's Challenge/ Le défi de Cyril 

This challenge consists of contestants making their own recipes in line with a given theme, usually a particular foodstuff (like the lemon) or a traditional bake (like the tarte Tatin).  However, Cyril expects the bakers to revisit classics, revamping them with the kinds of style, flavoring, and meticulous beauty that a professional pastry chef would employ.  Oftentimes, Cyril demands a trompe-l'oeil that resembles the foodstuff (like a pie that looks like an egg dish), rather than something merely incorporating it.

Contestans do not know what the challenge's theme will be until Cyril unveils it, but they are free to create on the spot any recipe they want with materials and ingredients at hand, or which they had previously brought with them. The judges and host interact with the contestants, and once they've judged the bakes, they announce their "top" ones along with their worst "flops."

 Mercotte's Technical Test/ L'épreuve technique de Mercotte 

In this challenge, the bakers are tasked with making a particular bake by scrupulously following a recipe provided by Mercotte.  These bakes can involve classic desserts of French patisserie, or the latest modern trends going around the internet.  Mercotte's bakes tend to be less meticulous than Cyril's, while being more playful and casual with decoration and flavors. Their finishing touches often incorporate elements of Cake decorating (le cake-design).

As in the British original, the recipe is deliberately written with crucial details omitted, forcing the contestants to rely on their technique and know-how. Unlike the original show, Mercotte's recipes are often printed in creative and offbeat ways befitting the theme, such as calligraphy on a scroll or in a spiral on a record.  They often come with long accompanying texts that at first seem completely extraneous but which prove to reveal critical information.  Mercotte only gives one piece of advice to the contestants: Lisez bien la recette !  'Read the recipe well!'.  The judging is blind, but just as strict as the first round.  The judges rank the bakes from worst to first.

 Creative Test/ L'épreuve créative 

The final phase involves creating and successfully baking a recipe that fits the challenge's theme (for instance, a dessert that is a trompe l'oeil of a regional savory dish). The presentation often includes decoration around the bake, which itself is usually grand in scale and sometimes monumental in size. The contestants’ skill, creativity, and aesthetic sensibilities are all put to the test.

Starting in season 11, the VIP judge also designates their favorite (le coup de coeur). This award contributes significantly to that contestant's standing in the competition that week.

During the baking, the judges and host interact with the contestants, along with the VIP guest. They offer advice and lay out expectations for the contestants' plans.

 Deliberation and judgement / Délibération et jugement 
Once the bakes are completed, the two judges meet alone in a room to compare performances.  In doing so, they reveal who is in line for Pastry Chef of the Week/the Blue Apron, and who is at risk of elimination.  After this the judges meet with the contestants. The VIP judge announces their coup de coeur, and the host announces who wins the Blue Apron, and who goes home.

Starting in Season 11, the eliminated contestant is kept behind and told that they have a chance to return to the tent, in a side competition, the Secret Kitchen (La cuisine secrète''). In this competition, they immediately face off against another eliminated contestant, in a duel to survive. The winner will face the next eliminated contestant the next week.  After Week 10, the survivor will be able to rejoin the main competition.

First season (2012)

Contestants

Second edition (2013)

Contestants

Third season (2014)

Contestants

References

French reality television series
France
French television series based on British television series
2012 French television series debuts
French-language television shows
M6 (TV channel) original programming
RTL-TVI original programming